Suk (also Romanized as Sūḵ; also known as Samūk) is a village in Dehrud Rural District, Eram District, Dashtestan County, Bushehr Province, Iran. At the 2006 census, its population was 74, in 17 families.

References 

Populated places in Dashtestan County